Enliniinae is a subfamily of flies in the family Dolichopodidae.

Genera
Enlinia Aldrich, 1933
Harmstonia Robinson, 1964
Haromyia Runyon, 2015 (incertae sedis – Eniliniinae or Achalcinae)

References

 
Dolichopodidae subfamilies
Taxa named by Harold E. Robinson